Olga Vasilyevna Klevakina (born 4 April 1962) is a Soviet retired swimmer. She competed at the 1980 Summer Olympics in six events: 100 m, 200 m, 400 m and 4 × 100 m freestyle and 400 m and 4 × 100 m medley, and reached finals in all events but the 4 × 100 m freestyle relay, because her team was disqualified in the preliminaries for an improper changeover. She won a bronze medal in the 4 × 100 m medley relay, where she swam for the Soviet team in the preliminaries, and finished fourth in the 100 m and 200 m freestyle.

She also won three medals at the 1977 and 1981 European Aquatics Championships in individual and team medley events, as well as three medals at the 1981 Summer Universiade.

Klevakina was born in Belarus and then moved to Moscow.

References

1962 births
Living people
Belarusian female freestyle swimmers
Belarusian female medley swimmers
Swimmers at the 1980 Summer Olympics
Soviet female freestyle swimmers
Soviet female medley swimmers
Olympic swimmers of the Soviet Union
Olympic bronze medalists for the Soviet Union
Olympic bronze medalists in swimming
European Aquatics Championships medalists in swimming
Medalists at the 1980 Summer Olympics
Universiade medalists in swimming
Universiade silver medalists for the Soviet Union
Universiade bronze medalists for the Soviet Union
Medalists at the 1981 Summer Universiade
People from Salihorsk
Sportspeople from Minsk Region